Milk Link was a large dairy company in the United Kingdom. It was the UK's largest dairy cooperative and the UK's largest producer of cheese. In 2012 the company merged with Arla Foods.

History
It was formed in April 2000 as one of three successor co-operatives to Milk Marque.  Milk Marque was broken up after the Competition Commission queried how it set milk prices.

In July 2002, the company bought the Crediton and Kirkcudbright creameries from Express Dairies for £33.1 million, both of which make UHT milk. It also bought out the 50% of joint-venture partner Express Dairies in the creamery at Frome. The Crediton operations were later sold in a management buyout.

In February 2004 it set up The Cheese Company with Kilkenny-based Glanbia, which had four cheese production sites and a packing facility supplying major retailers in the UK, in which it took a 75% stake.  In December 2006 it bought out Glanbia for £47.2 million.

In July 2005 it closed a site at Sible Hedingham.

From October 2007 to February 2008 there were talks to merge with First Milk.

In August 2011 it split into two divisions named 'Milk Link, Cheese' and 'Milk Link, Milk'.

In September 2011 it announced that it would increase the size of the Lockerbie creamery by 50% to produce 37,000 tonnes of cheese a year, into a UK market which consumes 600,000 tonnes of cheese a year.

In 2012 the company merged with Arla Foods.

Products
Each year it handles around 1.5 billion litres of milk.

It makes the chocolate-flavoured milk under licence for the Mars and Galaxy brand.

Cheeses
 Cheddar
 Stilton
 Cheshire
 Red Leicester
 Cheshire
 Double Gloucester
 Lancashire
 Wensleydale
 Caerphilly
 Cornish Brie
 Cornish Camembert
 Shropshire Blue

It exports cheese to 19 countries.

Structure

Creameries
 Crediton Dairy - sold April 2013 in a management buyout which trades as Crediton Dairy Limited.  
 Kirkcudbright
 Llandyrnog, north Wales (Now mothballed)
 Lockerbie (cheddar cheese) - the largest dairy plant in Scotland, off the A709 near the River Annan
 Melton Mowbray
 Taw Valley Creamery
 Trevarrian

See also
 First Milk, a Scottish dairy co-operative
 DairyCo

References

External links
 Milk Link Foodservice
 British Cheese Board

Video clips
 Milk Link YouTube channel
 Corporate video

News items
 Lockerbie plant in November 2011
 Lockerbie expansion in September 2011
 North Wales cheese plant in October 2009
 Buying north Wales cheese plant in June 2009
 Plans to close Scottish dairy in May 2009

Dairy products companies of the United Kingdom
Co-operatives in the United Kingdom
Food and drink companies established in 2000
2000 establishments in the United Kingdom
South Gloucestershire District
Companies based in Gloucestershire